Revaz Chanturia (born 31 May 1982) is a Georgian handball player who plays for RK Prilep 2010 and the Georgia men's national handball team.

References

http://www.eurohandball.com/ec/ehfc/men/2015-16/player/510610/RevazChanturia

1982 births
Living people
Male handball players from Georgia (country)
RK Vardar players
Sportspeople from Tbilisi